Piccola Orchestra Avion Travel (also known as Avion Travel) is an Italian musical group, formed in Caserta in 1980. The group was named after a travel agency situated in Caserta. They were discovered by Caterina Caselli.

In 2000 the band won the Sanremo Music Festival with the song "Sentimento".

The lead singer, Peppe Servillo, is the younger brother of actor Toni Servillo.

Current Lineup 

Peppe Servillo - vocals
Fausto Mesolella - guitar
Mimì Ciaramella - drums
Ferruccio Spinetti - bass
Flavio D'Ancona - keyboards

Former Members 

Agostino Di Scipio - guitar
Alberto D'Anna - drums
Sergio Buzzone - drums
Agostino Santoro - drums
Nicola Di Caprio - drums
Vittorio Remino - bass
Mario Tronco - keyboards
Peppe D'Argenzio - woodwinds

Discography

Albums 
 1987: Sorpassando 
 1988: Perdo tempo (Bubble Record, BLULP 1827)
 1989: In una notte di chiaro di luna (original soundtrack) (Bubble Record, BLULP 1831)
 1990: Bellosguardo
 1993: Opplà
 1995: Finalmente fiori
 1996: Hotel paura e altre storie
 1996: La guerra vista dalla luna
 1998: Vivo di canzoni
 1999: Cirano
 2000: Selezione 1990-2000
 2000: Storie d'amore
 2003: Poco mossi gli altri bacini
 2007: Danson metropoli - Canzoni di Paolo Conte
 2009: Nino Rota, l'amico magico

Awards 
 Premio della Critica Mia Martini at the 48th SanRemo Festival (1998)
 Winners of the 50th San Remo Festival (2000)

References

External links 

 

Italian musical groups
Musical groups established in 1980
Sanremo Music Festival winners